Leptostales rubromarginaria, the dark-ribboned wave, is a species of geometrid moth in the family Geometridae. It is found in North America.

The MONA or Hodges number for Leptostales rubromarginaria is 7179.

References

Further reading

 
 

Sterrhinae